Kąkolówka  is a village in the administrative district of Gmina Błażowa, within Rzeszów County, Subcarpathian Voivodeship, in south-eastern Poland.

The village has a population of 1,500.

References

External links

Villages in Rzeszów County